Red Hill may refer to:

Places

Australia
 Red Hill, Queensland, a suburb of Brisbane
 Red Hill, Queensland (Western Downs Region), a locality
 Red Hill, Victoria
 Red Hill South, Victoria
 Red Hill, Australian Capital Territory
 Red Hill, Western Australia
 Red Hill, Gulgong, New South Wales

Canada
Red Hill Valley, a valley in Hamilton, Ontario
Red Hill Creek, a creek in Hamilton, Ontario

United Kingdom

Natural formations
 Red Hill (salt making), an archaeological feature found in south-east England associated with ancient salt production
 Red Hill, Hampshire, England
 Red Hill, Lincolnshire, England, a Wildlife Trust nature reserve

Inhabited places
 Red Hill, Bournemouth, England, a location in the United Kingdom
 Red Hill, Herefordshire, England, a place in Herefordshire
 Red Hill, Kent, England, location in the United Kingdom
 Red Hill, Leicestershire, England, location in the United Kingdom
 Red Hill, London, a place near Chislehurst in the London Borough of Bromley
 Red Hill, Pembrokeshire, Wales, a location in the United Kingdom
 Red Hill, Warwickshire, England, a location in the United Kingdom
 Red Hill, West Yorkshire, England, a location in the United Kingdom
 Red Hill, Worcester, England

United States

Natural formations
 Red Hill (Merced County), a summit in the Diablo Range of California
 Red Hill (Ulster County, New York), a mountain
 Red Island Volcano, California
 Red Hill shale, roadcut exposure in Catskill Formation, Pennsylvania

Inhabited places

 A community in North Tustin, California
 Red Hill, Indiana
 Red Hill, Kentucky
 Red Hill, New Jersey
 Red Hill, Pennsylvania, in Montgomery County
 Red Hill, Blair County, Pennsylvania
 Red Hill, South Carolina
 Red Hill, West Virginia

Other places in the United States
 Red Hill (Bullock, North Carolina), an historic plantation
 Red Hill, New Mexico, a ghost town
 Red Hill Douglas County, Oregon AVA, Oregon wine region
 Red Hill Fire Observation Station, a fire tower on top of Red Hill, New York
 Red Hill Patrick Henry National Memorial, Virginia
 Red Hill, listed on the National Register of Historic Places in Charlotte County, Virginia
 Red Hill, Hawaiʻi, site of the US Navy Red Hill Underground Fuel Storage Facility
Red Hill Syenite, a geologic formation near Plymouth, New Hampshire

In other countries
 Red Hill (Hong Kong), a hill in Hong Kong. The Redhill Peninsula private housing estate is built on its slopes
 Red Hill, New Zealand a little town in Auckland Region in North Island of New Zealand

Entertainment
 Red Hill (album), a 2014 album by Wadada Leo Smith, Jamie Saft, Joe Morris and Balázs Pándi
 Red Hill (film), a 2010 Australian film
 Red Hill (TV series), a 2018 Armenian television series
 Red Hill Records, a former Christian record label

People
 William "Red" Hill Sr. (1888–1942), Canadian daredevil and river rescuer in Niagara Falls, Ontario, Canada

Other uses
 Red Hill water crisis, an environmental disaster originating from the Red Hill Underground Fuel Storage Facility in Hawaiʻi

See also
 Redhill (disambiguation)
 Red Hills (disambiguation)